Jalna railway station is a train station in the city of Jalna in the Indian state of Maharashtra. Jalna station lies on the Secunderabad–Manmad line of South Central Railway zone. Jalna is an important station in the Marathwada region with several trains stopping here daily. The government had approved a new line between Khamgaon Jalna and  Marathwada to Vidharbh.

List of trains

References

Railway stations in Jalna district
Jalna, Maharashtra
Transport in Jalna